Carl Axel Björk (5 August 1880–17 September 1952) was a New Zealand whaler, goldminer and character. He was born in Stockholm, Sweden on 5 August 1880. He died in Riverton, New Zealand in 1952.

References

1880 births
1952 deaths
New Zealand miners
New Zealand people in whaling
Swedish emigrants to New Zealand